The women's mass start competition at the 2020 European Speed Skating Championships was held on 12 January 2020.

Results
The race was started at 17:02.

References

Women's mass start